Myopopone castanea is a species of ant in the genus Myopopone. It was described by Smith in 1860.

Distribution
Myopopone castanea is distributed in several Asian countries (such as Borneo andIndonesia) and in Australia, where they prefer to nest in rotten wood or bark.

Ecology
M. castanea is a predator of Coleoptera larvae that has been studied for potential use as a biological pest control insect of Oryctes rhinoceros larvae. The species is the only species known that has workers engage in larval hemolymph feeding.

References

External links

Amblyoponinae
Hymenoptera of Asia
Hymenoptera of Australia
Insects of Australia
Insects described in 1860